Mahanuwara Grama Niladhari Division is a Grama Niladhari Division of the Kandy Four Gravets & Gangawata Korale Divisional Secretariat of Kandy District of Central Province, Sri Lanka. It has Grama Niladhari Division Code 257.

Ehelepola Walauwa, Temple of the Tooth, Temple of the Tooth Museum, A9 road (Sri Lanka), St. Paul's Church, Kandy, Empire Hotel, Kandy, Giragama Walawwa, Queen's Hotel, Kandy, Roman Catholic Diocese of Kandy and Kandy are located within, nearby or associated with Mahanuwara.

Mahanuwara is a surrounded by the Asgiriya, Bogambara, Boowelikada, Ihala Katukele, Mahaiyawa and Malwatta Grama Niladhari Divisions.

Demographics

Ethnicity 

The Mahanuwara Grama Niladhari Division has a Sinhalese majority (58.2%), a significant Moor population (23.6%) and a significant Sri Lankan Tamil population (15.3%). In comparison, the Kandy Four Gravets & Gangawata Korale Divisional Secretariat (which contains the Mahanuwara Grama Niladhari Division) has a Sinhalese majority (74.6%) and a significant Moor population (10.9%)

Religion 

The Mahanuwara Grama Niladhari Division has a Buddhist plurality (49.6%), a significant Muslim population (26.2%) and a significant Hindu population (15.1%). In comparison, the Kandy Four Gravets & Gangawata Korale Divisional Secretariat (which contains the Mahanuwara Grama Niladhari Division) has a Buddhist majority (70.9%), a significant Muslim population (12.0%) and a significant Hindu population (10.2%)

Gallery

References 

Grama Niladhari divisions of Sri Lanka
Kandy District